Nowy Kisielin  is a district of the city of Zielona Góra, in western Poland, located in the eastern part of the city. It was a separate village until 2014.

Nowy Kisielin has a population of 1,121.

References

Neighbourhoods in Poland
Zielona Góra